Mt. Zion Church and Cemetery (United Baptist Church) is a historic church building near Elkhorn, Henry County, Tennessee, United States.  It was built sometime between 1872 and 1899, most likely in 1893, and added to the National Register of Historic Places in 1974.  It is the only surviving building in the "Old 23rd District" of Henry County, an extinct community since 1944.

This building might be confused with Mount Zion Church located approximately twenty miles south near Big Sandy, Benton County, Tennessee, which was destroyed by fire in the 1990s, possibly 1992.

Location 

The building is on a small, remote peninsula colloquially referred to as the "Old 23rd District."   Today, this land is part of the Big Sandy Unit of the Tennessee National Wildlife Refuge.  Between about 1821 and 1944, a small community of families lived and farmed there.  Besides farming, the community produced timber and lumber, railroad cross ties and cleaned mussel shells for the button-making industry.  The remote location also made moonshining quite lucrative.  In the community, there were two churches, two or three stores, a sawmill and a post office at various times.  The first post office was Gillie, Tennessee, established in 1888 and absorbed by Pace, Tennessee in 1899.  Pace, Tennessee was established in 1890 and absorbed by a rural route out of Big Sandy in Benton County, Tennessee in 1904.

In 1938, the Tennessee Valley Authority (TVA) began construction of Kentucky Dam on the Tennessee River.  Impounding the river meant that flood waters would consume a large part of the community, so in 1940, TVA began buying out property and moving all families out of the area.  Buildings below the flood level were given to their prior owners and buildings above the flood level were auctioned off.  All buildings had to be moved out by a certain date after which TVA burned what remained.  Timber below the flood level was cut and burned on a tight schedule, preventing much of its use to sawmillers.  Cemeteries that would be flooded or whose access would be flooded were surveyed, next of kin contacted, and decisions made on removal and relocation or remaining in place.

The Mt. Zion Church building and cemetery exist well above the flood level therefore they enjoyed some special treatment.  When TVA purchased the site, an agreement was made with the church trustees to leave the building standing and allow the congregation to meet there annually for a homecoming.  This homecoming still occurs on the first Sunday in July of each year.

History 

Mt. Zion Church may have first met in 1829.  It petitioned to and was accepted by the Western District Baptist Association in 1853.

The first church building was a log structure built on land donated by James Monroe Gray.  It stood across the road from the current building and was also used as a school.  It was torn down sometime between 1890 and 1900.

Land for the current building was donated by Rhoda Gray McDaniel, daughter of James Monroe Gray.  In the Pictorial History of the Old 23rd District, Larry T. Perry states that the current church was built in 1897, however the National Register of Historical Places has listed 1893.  Entries in the Western District Association minutes list also 1872, 1896 and 1899 as dates of construction for the current building.

Dickerson served Mt. Zion for 18 years and never lived within the church community. Every Saturday, he would come to Paris where he was met by a member of the congregation and taken back to the community. He would spend the night with a church family, preach on Sunday morning and then leave on Sunday afternoon with some farm produce given by church members.

In 1896 and 1938, the Western District Association held their annual conferences at the Mt. Zion church.

By 1943, the church was without a pastor and in the process of disbanding. They agreed with the church trustees, Isham Robbins, T. J. Fielder and W. C. Flowers, to leave the building standing and to allow the congregation to meet there annually for a homecoming. The last report was sent to the Association in 1944.

Mt. Zion Church had an irregular representation and report in the Association minutes.  However spotty these reports may be, they are the most tangible way to understand the size and impact the church had upon its community.  The following aggregate data is taken from Perry's book.

Cemetery 

The Mt. Zion cemetery is located just behind, to the west of the church building. It is surrounded by a chain link fence and is regularly cared for.  As of April 2007, there were 222 graves known. Burials still occur there.

References

Baptist churches in Tennessee
Buildings and structures in Henry County, Tennessee
Cemeteries in Tennessee
Former churches in Tennessee
Churches on the National Register of Historic Places in Tennessee
National Register of Historic Places in Henry County, Tennessee